Michael Sergeant is an English author, communications consultant and former journalist who worked for the BBC, Sky News, Reuters and CNN as a political correspondent, business correspondent and general news reporter. He worked as a foreign correspondent in more than 25 countries including Iraq and Lebanon. He was the BBC's main on-air local authority expert – covering council finance, services, benefit reform, housing, planning and infrastructure. He also covered general and political stories across the UK for programmes including Today, BBC Breakfast and the BBC News Channel. He announced his departure from mainstream broadcasting in October 2014, joining public relations firm Headland as a client-facing director. He left Headland in 2017 to form his own communications company, Sergeant Consulting. He is the author of PR for Humans: how business leaders tell powerful stories.

Early career
After receiving an MA in Economics from Cambridge University, Sergeant started his career in the media by working for the Associated Press Television News. Following one year at the news channel, Sergeant moved to Sky News, becoming their first e-commerce correspondent, covering events such as the dot-com bubble. He soon left the channel to join the BBC.

Career

After leaving Sky News in 2001, Sergeant joined the BBC as a business reporter, working across the BBC's business output, including World Business Report and BBC Breakfast. He then worked exclusively for BBC Breakfast, covering business events and planning segments. He also briefly worked as a political correspondent during the 2005 General Election.

Following a successful six years in business, Sergeant became the BBC's Middle East reporter, covering events including the Iraq War, the Gaza War and the Arab Spring.

He then returned to his business and political roots, becoming a correspondent for politics, business and general news.

He has worked as the BBC's local government correspondent and was a regular contributor to the BBC News Channel.

In October 2014, Sergeant announced his departure from the BBC after 13 years. He subsequently joined PR and media agency Headland as a client-facing director.

References

Living people
Alumni of the University of Cambridge
BBC newsreaders and journalists
English male journalists
English people of Russian descent
English political commentators
English television presenters
People educated at Westminster School, London
British social commentators
British opinion journalists
Year of birth missing (living people)